The 2018 Calgary National Bank Challenger was a professional tennis tournament played on indoor hard courts. It was the first edition of the tournament and part of the 2018 ATP Challenger Tour. It took place in Calgary, Canada.

Singles entrants

Seeds

Other entrants 
The following players received wildcards into the singles main draw:
  Steven Diez
  Alexis Galarneau
  Pavel Krainik
  Harrison Scott

The following players received entry into the singles main draw as alternates:
  Cem İlkel
  Stefan Kozlov

The following players received entry from the qualifying draw:
  Tom Fawcett
  Borna Gojo
  Vincent Millot
  Pablo Vivero González

The following player received entry as a lucky loser:
  Laurent Rochette

Champions

Singles

  Ivo Karlović def.  Jordan Thompson 7–6(7–3), 6–3.

Doubles

  Robert Galloway /  Nathan Pasha def.  Matt Reid /  John-Patrick Smith 6–4, 4–6, [10–6].

Calgary National Bank Challenger
2018
Calgary